Mohammed Majid bin Hassan Junior (born 1949) is a former Hong Kong international lawn and indoor bowler.

Bowls career
Hassan started playing aged 13 and has played for both Somerset and Essex in addition to the Indian Recreation Club in So Kon Po Valley. 

He won a gold medal in the fours at the 1978 Commonwealth Games in Edmonton.

He won two medals at the Asia Pacific Bowls Championships including a gold medal in the 1985 triples at Tweed Heads, New South Wales.

References

Hong Kong male bowls players
Commonwealth Games medallists in lawn bowls
1949 births
Living people
Commonwealth Games gold medallists for Hong Kong
Bowls players at the 1978 Commonwealth Games
Medallists at the 1978 Commonwealth Games